The following is a list of episodes of the anime television series Doraemon (2005 anime).

2015

2016

2017

2018

2019

References

Doraemon (anime)
Doraemon lists
Doraemon